Wilhelm Sachsenmaier (24 February 1927 – 14 April 2017) was an Austrian sports shooter. He competed at the 1952 Summer Olympics and 1960 Summer Olympics. He also was a biochemist, a cancer researcher, and a professor at the University of Innsbruck from 1970 until his retirement.

References

External links
 

1927 births
2017 deaths
Austrian male sport shooters
Olympic shooters of Austria
Shooters at the 1952 Summer Olympics
Shooters at the 1960 Summer Olympics
People from Kufstein
Academic staff of the University of Innsbruck
Sportspeople from Tyrol (state)
20th-century Austrian people